The 1987 European Open  was a women's tennis tournament played on outdoor clay courts in Geneva, Switzerland that was part of the Category 2 tier of the 1987 Virginia Slims World Championship Series. It was the 11th edition of the tournament and was held from 18 May until 24 May 1987. First-seeded Chris Evert won the singles title, her third at the event after 1981 and 1982.

Finals

Singles
 Chris Evert defeated  Manuela Maleeva 6–3, 4–6, 6–2
 It was Evert's 4th singles title of the year and the 152nd of her career.

Doubles
 Betsy Nagelsen /  Elizabeth Smylie defeated  Laura Gildemeister /  Catherine Tanvier 4–6, 6–4, 6–3

References

External links
 ITF tournament edition details

Swiss Open
WTA Swiss Open
1987 in Swiss tennis
1987 in Swiss women's sport